Björn Gustaf von Sydow (born 26 November 1945) is a former speaker (talman) of the Riksdag, the Swedish parliament. He held this office following the 2002 election, when he succeeded Birgitta Dahl, until he was replaced on 2 October 2006. A member of the Swedish Social Democratic Party, he had been Minister of Defence in Göran Persson's government between 1997 and 2002, preceded by a short term as Minister of Commerce and Industry.

Apart from leading the Riksdag sessions, von Sydow was also while in office eligible to serve as acting-regent (Riksföreståndare) in the absence of the King and his three children, e.g. if they all went abroad simultaneously, although that never happened.

The speaker also had a key role when the government resigned. However, when Göran Persson asked for his resignation after the lost 2006 election, the parliamentary situation was very clear, so already on 19 September 2006 Sydow could formally ask Fredrik Reinfeldt to begin the formation of a new government to take office after the new Riksdag has assembled to approve it. On 2 October 2006, the changed majority situation in the Riksdag also had Sydow replaced by Moderate Party politician and previous Vice Speaker Per Westerberg. Already before the election, Sydow had stated that he was not interested in a Vice Speaker position, so that office went to fellow Social Democrat Jan Björkman.

von Sydow was awarded a Ph.D. in political science at Linköping University in 1978, and later worked as rector of the Social Work College at Stockholm University. In 2008, he was elected a member of the Royal Swedish Academy of Sciences.

Björn von Sydow has taken his mother's surname and is a distant relative of the actor Max von Sydow. He lives in Solna outside Stockholm, is married and has four children.

References

External links
Curriculum Vitae in English

|-

|-

|-

1945 births
Living people
Members of the Riksdag from the Social Democrats
Swedish Ministers for Defence
Speakers of the Riksdag
Swedish political scientists
Linköping University alumni
Academic staff of Stockholm University
Members of the Royal Swedish Academy of Sciences
Recipients of the Order of the Cross of Terra Mariana, 1st Class
Articles containing video clips
Members of the Riksdag 2002–2006